The Magic Kingdom is a theme park at the Walt Disney World Resort in Florida.

Magic Kingdom may also refer to:
 Adventures in the Magic Kingdom, a Disney video game released for the Nintendo Entertainment System
 Magic Kingdom (band), a Belgian band
 Magic Kingdom, Sydney, a defunct theme park in Sydney, Australia
 Magic Kingdom of Landover, a series of novels by Terry Brooks
 The Magic Kingdom, a 1985 novel by Stanley Elkin
 The Magic Kingdom: Walt Disney and the American Way of Life
 Disney Magic Kingdoms, a Disney video game for mobile devices and computers by Gameloft

See also
 Disneyland (disambiguation)